Hehe may refer to:
 the Hehe people, an ethnic and linguistic group based in Tanzania
 the Hehe language, a Bantu language spoken by the Hehe people
 an onomatopoeia for laughter